Elections to Derbyshire County Council took place on 4 June 2009 as part of the 2009 United Kingdom local elections, having been delayed from 7 May, in order to coincide with elections to the European Parliament.

All locally registered electors (British, Irish, Commonwealth and European Union citizens) who were aged 18 or over on Thursday 2 May 2013 were entitled to vote in the local elections. Those who were temporarily away from their ordinary address (for example, away working, on holiday, in student accommodation or in hospital) were also entitled to vote in the local elections, although those who had moved abroad and registered as overseas electors cannot vote in the local elections. It is possible to register to vote at more than one address (such as a university student who had a term-time address and lives at home during holidays) at the discretion of the local Electoral Register Office, but it remains an offence to vote more than once in the same local government election.

Summary
The election was won by the Conservatives who were elected with a small overall majority. It ended 28 consecutive years of local governance by the Labour Party

Results

|}

References

2009 English local elections
2009
2000s in Derbyshire